The C. W. Parker Carousel is a carousel built in 1912 currently operating in the Burnaby Village Museum at Deer Lake Park in Burnaby, British Columbia. The carousel was built by the C. W. Parker Company and is also known as the Parker #119 and the Burnaby Centennial Parker Carousel.  The carousel was the 119th such machine built by the C. W. Parker Company, earning it its "Parker #119" nickname.  The carousel contains 41 horses and operates at a pavilion known as the Don Wrigley Pavilion located at one of the museum's two entrances, earning the entrance the name "Carousel Entrance".

History
The carousel was built in 1912 at Leavenworth, Kansas by Charles Wallace Parker who owned the C. W. Parker Company, and was the 119th one made by them.  It was sold in 1913 for $5,886.00.  The carousel toured Texas for two years with the Lone Star Circus.  In 1915 the machine was shipped back to the factory.

It is believed that the machine was rebuilt by the factory.  Some fancier horses and heavier rounding boards may have been added.  Some of the horses were built in 1917 and some in 1920–1922.  The history of the carousel from 1915 to 1936 is unknown.  The carousel was purchased by Happyland, an amusement park in Vancouver, British Columbia in 1936.

The carousel remained at Happyland until the amusement park was demolished in 1957. It was moved to the new small pavilion in Playland, (another amusement park in Vancouver) until that too was demolished in 1972.

From 1972 to 1989, Parker #119 was operated outdoors, and was put away each winter.

In 1989 it was announced that the carousel would be sold off horse by horse at an auction in New York.  Local residents came together to save the carousel and formed the "Friends of the Vancouver Carousel Society".  It was at this time that the carousel was nicknamed the Parker #119.

In May 1989, the Burnaby Village Museum agreed to provide a home for the carousel and the "Friends", led by President Don Wrigley, set about raising the $350,000 to purchase the machine. Keith Jamieson, a carousel expert, was brought in to coordinate the rebuilding project. In 1990, the carousel was purchased.  Funds were also raised to pay for the restoration. People who donated money could sponsor a horse and later name it.  The museum agreed to build a new pavilion to house the carousel.  The pavilion, named the Don Wrigley Pavilion was completed in 1993.  The carousel was then named the Burnaby Centennial Parker Carousel.

Carousel horses
The carousel's horses are listed here:

Notes:

 Not on carousel
 Not really a horse, but considered one of listing purposes
 Is really four small metal ponies and a wheelchair
 Has many sponsors
 Is really two small metal ponies

Carousel horse notes
This section notes horses that are not actually on the carousel and horses that are not really horses.

Some of the carousel's horses are not actually horses, but are listed as such for the purpose of creating a list on the carousel's horses. Examples of this are Horse #38, "Gold Heart Chariot" and Horse #40, "Wurlitzer Band Organ".

Horse #37, known as "Old Paint", was sponsored by the Burnaby Village Museum and was not restored, as a reminder to visitors of the sorry state the carousel was in when the museum first acquired it. The horse was named for the "old paint" that was originally on the carousel before it was restored. The horse is currently in a display case next to the carousel.

Horse #39 is really four small ponies and a wheelchair. This was placed to make the carousel accessible to toddlers and disabled people.

Horse #41 is really two small ponies. While originally on the carousel with Horse #39, they were removed to make room for Horse #39's wheelchair and placed, one each, at the museum's two entrances.

There were originally two chariots on the carousel. One has since gone missing while the carousel was under the ownership of a theme park. The ponies which now form Horses #39 and #41 were added to the area where the other chariot was originally placed. Horse #38 was also cut in half, removing the backdrop and adding more seats to the carousel (a plan to generate more income from the carousel by allowing more people to ride it, done by one of the carousel's theme park owners). When the carousel was bought by the museum, Horse #38 underwent restoration, adding a backdrop to it, making it a chariot once again.

Carousel horse rows
Row 1: 
Outside: #1 Captain Julius,
Middle: #13 Nipoti,
Inside: #25 Pisces

Row 2:
Outside: #2 Royal Burnaby Belle,
Middle: #14 Mr. Ed,
Inside: #26 Meg

Row 3:
Outside: #3 Champion,
Middle: #15 Allegro,
Inside: #27 Wheeler

Row 4:
Outside: #4 Firefly,
Middle: #16 John Ernest,
Inside: #28 Guppy

Row 5:
Outside: #5 Phar Lap,
Middle: #17 Betty B.,
Inside: #29 Rebel

Row 6:
Outside: #6 Scampering Dawn,
Middle: #18 Bingo,
Inside: #30 Royal Warrior

Row 7:
Outside: #7 Vanessa,
Middle: #19 Dyck,
Inside: #31 Venus

Row 8:
Outside: #8 Treasure,
Middle: #20 Twister,
Inside: #32 The Colonel

Row 9:
Outside: #9 Mignonette,
Middle: #21 Centennial,
Inside: #33 Happy Marie

Row 10:
Outside: #10 Valiant,
Middle: #22 Tommy D.,
Inside: #34 Shannon

Row 11:
Outside: #11 Vivian,
Middle: #23 Rose B.
Inside: #35 Annie

Row 12:
Outside: #12 Nareena,
Middle: #24 James,
Inside: #36 Royal George

See also
Lander Park Carousel
Jantzen Beach Carousel, a C. W. Parker carousel in use in Portland, Oregon until 2012
City of Waterloo Carousel

C. W. Parker carousels are in use in
Faulkton, South Dakota
Roseneath, Ontario 
Waterloo, Wisconsin
Madison, Wisconsin
Flint, Michigan

External links
 City of Burnaby C. W. Parker Carousel webpage
 C. W. Parker Carousel Museum webpage
 Westland.net, for details of fate of some C. W. Parker carousels, roller coasters & Carousels webpage

 

Carousels
Amusement rides introduced in 1912
Buildings and structures in Burnaby
Tourist attractions in Burnaby
1912 establishments in Kansas